The 2019 Senior League World Series took place from July 27–August 3  in Easley, South Carolina. Wailuku, Hawaii defeated Willemstad, Curaçao in the championship game.

Teams

Results

United States Bracket

International Bracket

Consolation Round

World Championship

References

Senior League World Series
Senior League World Series
Senior
Senior League
Sports competitions in South Carolina